Víctor Damián Meza (born 28 January 1987) was an Argentine footballer,

His last club was Leandro N. Alem.

Honours

Player
Sportivo Italiano
 Primera B Metropolitana (1): 2008–09

References
 Profile at BDFA 
 

1987 births
Living people
Argentine footballers
Argentine expatriate footballers
San Lorenzo de Almagro footballers
Unión San Felipe footballers
Expatriate footballers in Chile
Association football forwards
Footballers from Buenos Aires